The Eiger Sanction is a 1972 thriller novel by Trevanian, the pen name of Rodney William Whitaker. The story is about a classical art professor and collector who doubles as a professional assassin, and who is coerced out of retirement to avenge the murder of an American agent. The novel was made into a film of the same name in 1975, directed by and starring Clint Eastwood. Whitaker wrote a sequel entitled The Loo Sanction.

Plot
Dr. Jonathan Hemlock is an art professor and mountaineer. He is also a collector of paintings, most of them obtained from the black market. To finance his collection, Hemlock, who served in the Counter Intelligence Corps during the Korean War, works as a so-called "counter-assassin" for a secret US government agency, the CII.

In order to acquire a Pissarro, Hemlock agrees to carry out a couple of "sanctions" (contract assassinations targeted specifically against killers of American agents). The first one is easily dealt with in Montreal. For the second, he will need to join a group of climbers who are about to attempt the north face of the Eiger, a particularly difficult challenge that Hemlock has tried before and failed. Hemlock goes back into training and eventually climbs the mountain with the team that he believes includes his would-be victim — whose identity he will have to deduce on the mountain itself. Poor climbing conditions disrupt the climb and lead Hemlock to the discovery that his target is someone other than he had expected.

The progress of the climb in the book almost exactly mirrors the 1936 attempt on the Eigerwand (North Face of the Eiger) by Bavarian climbers Andreas Hinterstoisser and Toni Kurz and Austrian climbers Willy Angerer and Edi Rainer. After failing in their attempt, three climbers were killed whilst retreating from the mountain, Hinterstoisser by avalanche, Angerer by a fall and Rainer by asphyxiation trying to hold Angerer's fall. Kurz survived the fall, hanging by a rope. Rescuers were able to get close to Kurz by using the window of the Eigerwand railway station but could not reach him. After four days, he died, his last words being "Ich kann nicht mehr" ("I can't go (on) any more"). In the film, Clint Eastwood's character is rescued rather than dying on the rope.

See also

 Assassinations in fiction
 Spy fiction

References

External links
 The Eiger Sanction at Trevanian.com
 The Eiger Sanction at Google Books

1972 American novels
English-language novels
American thriller novels
Albinism in popular culture
Works published under a pseudonym
American novels adapted into films
Novels set in Switzerland
Eiger
1972 debut novels

ja:アイガー・サンクション